Solitarily Speaking Of Theoretical Confinement is the second solo album by progressive metal guitarist Ron Jarzombek, released in 2002.

Every song follows a loose concept of basing each song's composition on certain songwriting systems created by Jarzombek himself; the song titles are usually humorous references to these systems, explained in the liner notes: For example, "To B or Not to B" consists of 2 themes, one only using the note B ("To B"), and using every note except for B ("Not to B"); "A Headache and a Sixty-Fourth" is written in 65/64 time.

Track listing
 "Wait a Second..." - 00:04	
 "A Headache and a Sixty-Fourth" - 01:42	
 "I've Got the Runs" - 01:20	
 "Spelling Bee" - 00:42	
 "911" - 00:58	
 "Melodramatic Chromatic" - 01:19	
 "To B or Not to B" - 00:44	
 "Dramatic Chromatic" - 02:09	
 "Frank Can Get Drunk and Eat Beer" - 00:56	
 "Battle of the Hands" - 01:57	
 "About Face" - 00:49	
 "Having Second Thoughts" - 01:56	
 "Two-Face" - 00:04	
 "7 Up" - 00:49	
 "Sabbatic Chromatic" - 01:35	
 "207.222.200.112" - 00:14	
 "Grizzly Bears Don't Fly Airplanes" - 00:15	
 "Snuff" - 02:45	
 "Sex With Squeakie" - 01:28	
 "Two Thirds of Satan" - 02:38	
 "At The 7-11" - 01:03	
 "On Second Thought" - 00:56	
 "The Whole Truth, Nothing But..." - 00:20	
 "Sick, Dirty, Sick" - 00:52	
 "Minor Yours" - 00:42	
 "Minor Else!" - 00:55	
 "Give Me a Break" - 00:04	
 "Yum Yum Tree" - 01:20	
 "At the Stop-N-Go" - 01:16	
 "On a Scale from 1 to 10" - 01:08	
 "Static Chromatic" - 00:41	
 "Rigidude" - 00:39	
 "Erratic Chromatic" - 01:22	
 "WatchTower" - 00:14	
 "Back and Forth" - 00:41	
 "Dimented" - 00:08	
 "1st and 10" - 01:09	
 "Gimme 5" - 01:23	
 "In the Name of Ron" - 01:11	
 "I've Got the Runs Again" - 00:48	
 "Tri, Tri Again" - 00:53	
 "9 to 5" - 01:17	
 "I've Got The Runs Really Bad" - 00:58	
 "Gee!" - 00:03	
 "I'll Be Back..." - 00:15

All songs composed by Ron Jarzombek.

Band line-up
The "line-up" for the album actually consisted only of Ron Jarzombek; the other "band members" are actually samples from sound modules with pseudonyms of their own.
Ron Jarzombek - Guitars, Bass, Drum Programming
Roland Emessy I - Strings and Synths (Roland MSE1)
Prodeus Effecks - Piano, Harp, Bells, marimba, B3 and Chinese Gong (Proteus FX)
Dee Fore - Drums and Percussion (Alesis D4)

References

2002 albums
Concept albums